See El Mansurah (disambiguation) for other sites with similar names.

Al-Mansura was a Palestinian Arab village in the Safad Subdistrict.

History

Ottoman period
The Christian missionary W.M. Thomson, traveling during the Ottoman Empire period, in 1852,  mentions a corn mill at Mansura and comments that the wider region depended on the area around Mansura for Indian corn, rice and sesamum. He saw hundreds of bee hives in Mansura. They were made from cylindrical baskets covered in mud and dung which were piled into a pyramid and covered with a thatched roof. As well as honey production the residents also exported buffalo butter from their large herds of water buffalo. He comments that the area had a large permanent population, the Ghawaraneh tribe, living in tents. He writes that he knows the names of over thirty permanent Arab encampments in the Huleh plain.

In January 1869 canoeing pioneer John MacGregor spent the night beside the village corn-mill. It was the only stone building in the area and had a flat roof. Other buildings he saw had mud walls with a reed roof or were completely made of reeds. There were also bedouin in tents. The miller was Christian and had arrived the year before following the killing of four of his children during the massacres further north. Besides milling corn he also sold gunpowder. As the MacGregor party, with his canoe on the back of a mule, approached Al-Mansura they met a procession celebrating the end of Ramadan, Eid al-Fitr. They were greeted with excitement because it was assumed they were entertainers travelling to the village to join in the celebrations. MacGregor commented that most of the men had tattoos or scars on their faces as well as ear and nose rings. The women's face were stained with blue patterns. "Their dress was the most various possible, long and short, coloured and plain, scanty and ample, of camel´s hair from Damascus, silk from Lebanon and Manchester cotton."

In 1881 the PEF's Survey of Western Palestine described the village as consisting "of stone and mud hovels on the plain, surrounded by arable land; river near; the village contains about seventy Moslems."

British Mandate of Palestine period
In the 1922 census of Palestine conducted by the British Mandate authorities, Mansura had an all-Muslim population of 41.  This had increased in the 1931 census when El Mansura had an all-Muslim population of 89,  in 18 houses.

In the 1945 statistics the population was 360, all Muslims, owning 1,254 dunams of land, while Jews owned 175 dunams, and 115 was publicly owned, according to an official land and population survey. Of this,  1,424 dunams were allocated for plantations and irrigable land, while 5 dunams were classified as built-up areas.

1948, and after
The village was depopulated during the 1948 War on May 25, 1948, under Operation Yiftach.

The settlement She'ar Yashuv is located on village lands, about 1 km northeast of the village site. In 1992 the village site was described as: "The village has been completely obliterated and it is difficult to identify any trace of its former buildings. The site has been converted into a fish hatchery and contain pools for this purpose. Between the pools there is a narrow strip of thorns and trees."

See also 
Mallaha
Al-Salihiyya

References

Bibliography

External links
Welcome To al-Mansura
al-Mansura (Safed), Zochrot
Survey of Western Palestine, Map 2:   IAA, Wikimedia commons

Arab villages depopulated during the 1948 Arab–Israeli War
District of Safad